Tafihan (also Romanized as Tafihān; also known as Tafīhān, Tafīum, Tafyūn, and Tayūn) is a village in Bid Zard Rural District, in the Central District of Shiraz County, Fars Province, Iran. At the 2006 census, its population was 4,671, in 1,142 families.

References 

Populated places in Shiraz County